Ginette Keller (16 May 1925 - 27 June 2010) was a French composer.

Biography

Keller was born in Asnières-sur-Seine. She studied at the Conservatoire de Paris with Nadia Boulanger, Tony Aubin and Olivier Messiaen. In 1951 she won the Second Prix de Rome with her cantata Et l’Homme vit se rouvrir les portes.

She taught aural training at the "Conservatoire" and analysis and counterpoint at the École Normale de Musique in Paris. She has composed for solo instruments, chamber and orchestral music. She has also written two operas with librettos by Alain Germain.

Selected works
Six chants de Lumière et d'Ombre for winds quartet, 1965
Variables, premiered in 1966
Chant de Parthénope for flute & piano, 1968
Girations for percussion & piano, 1970
Graphiques for soprano and ensemble, premiered at Festival International du Son 1971
Ebauches for bassoon & piano, 1973
Les Vieilles Dames d'Osnabrück, Opera, premiered in 1983
Les adieux d'une cantatrice sans mémoire, Opera, premiered in 1986
Vibrations pour harpe celtique, 1990
Dialogues for clarinet & piano, 1992
Sept mouvements incantatoires for four percussions, drums, celesta & a bowed instrument
Paramorphoses for metals orchestra, piano & percussion
Et l’Homme vit se rouvrir les portes, cantata
Dialogues for clarinet & piano
Tropes for piano

External links
Scores by Ginette Keller
arkivmusic.com 
KELLER Ginette

1925 births
2010 deaths
People from Asnières-sur-Seine
20th-century classical composers
French opera composers
Prix de Rome for composition
French women classical composers
Conservatoire de Paris alumni
Academic staff of the Conservatoire de Paris
Academic staff of the École Normale de Musique de Paris
Women opera composers
20th-century French women musicians
20th-century French composers
Women music educators
20th-century women composers